Duke Friedrich August of Oldenburg (11 January 19369 July 2017) was a member of the House of Holstein-Gottorp. He is a son of Nikolaus, Hereditary Grand Duke of Oldenburg and Princess Helena of Waldeck and Pyrmont.

Family and early life
Frederich August is the sixth child and fourth son of Nikolaus, Hereditary Grand Duke of Oldenburg and his first wife Princess Helena of Waldeck and Pyrmont. His paternal grandparents are Frederick Augustus II, Grand Duke of Oldenburg and Duchess Elisabeth Alexandrine of Mecklenburg-Schwerin. His maternal grandparents are Friedrich, Prince of Waldeck and Pyrmont and Princess Bathildis of Schaumburg-Lippe.

His grandfather was overthrown as Grand Duke of Oldenburg in 1918, at the end of World War I. His father Nikolaus thus never legally succeeded to the title when the deposed Grand Duke died in 1931. Friedrich is an uncle of Christian, Duke of Oldenburg, the current head of the House of Oldenburg.

Marriage and issue
Friedrich August's first wife was Princess Marie Cécile of Prussia. She was a daughter of Louis Ferdinand, Prince of Prussia (second son of William, German Crown Prince) and his wife, Grand Duchess Kira Kirillovna of Russia. They married in Berlin in a civil ceremony on 3 December 1965 and a religious ceremony the following day. He was working as an agricultural expert. The ceremony was the first Hohenzollern marriage in Berlin since 1913.

Friedrich August and Marie-Cécile have three children: a son, and two daughters. Marie-Cécile and Friedrich August divorced on 23 November 1989. On 9 February 1991, Friedrich August was remarried to Donata Countess of Castell-Rüdenhausen in Rüdenhausen, Germany. She was the widow of Marie-Cécile's brother, Prince Louis Ferdinand of Prussia. Donata died at Traunstein on 5 September 2015 after a long illness.

Ancestry

References

1936 births
2017 deaths
People from Ammerland
Dukes of Oldenburg
People from Oldenburg (state)
Burials at the Ducal Mausoleum, Gertrudenfriedhof (Oldenburg)